Indiana Jones and the Kingdom of the Crystal Skull (Original Motion Picture Soundtrack) is the film score to the 2008 film of the same name, composed and conducted by John Williams. Returning to record the score was the contracted orchestra of Sandy de Crescent: a.k.a. the Hollywood Studio Orchestra. The soundtrack album was released on May 20, 2008.

Track listing

Like most of John Williams' soundtracks, the tracks are not listed in the order they appear in the film. To listen to the soundtrack in chronological order would go 6, 8, 7, 12, 14, 11, 9, 5, 10, 16, 15, 13, 17, 18, and 19 along with 1 - 4 as bonus tracks heard in concert theme.

The soundtrack debuted on the Billboard 200 at number 39 during its first week.

Personnel

John Williams – producer
Ramiro Belgardt – music editor
Shawn Murphy – recording, mixing engineer
Sandy de Crescent – music contractor
Peter Rotter – music contractor
Hollywood Film Chorale – choir
Sally Stevens – vocal contractor
Jo Ann Kane Music Service – music preparation
Patricia Sullivan Fourstar – mastering
Andrew Pham – package design

References

External links
Soundtrack Review at Tracksounds.

Indiana Jones music
2008 soundtrack albums
2000s film soundtrack albums
Albums with cover art by Drew Struzan
John Williams soundtracks
Concord Records albums